Joseph McCusker was an American ice hockey defenseman who played for Boston College after World War II.

Career
McCusker began playing ice hockey at Boston College in 1946, joining the team just as head coach John Kelley returned from his time serving in the war. In his sophomore season the NCAA introduced a National Tournament for ice hockey and McCusker was one of the driving forces behind BC being invited to participate in the inaugural championship. The following year BC had high hopes to win the championship and produced one of the best seasons in college hockey history. McCusker, however, missed most of the season after starting with 7 points in 7 games. Boston College would go on to win the championship in 1949 and though he didn't play, McCusker was part of BC's first national championship.

McCusker returned with a vengeance for his senior season, pushing the Eagles to their third consecutive tournament appearance and being named an AHCA Second Team All-American Unfortunately, Boston College wasn't able to recapture the magic of 1949 and the team lost both games to finish 4th.

McCusker was inducted into the Boston College varsity hall of fame in 1994.

Awards and honors

References

External links
 

Year of birth unknown
Year of death unknown
American men's ice hockey defensemen
Ice hockey players from Massachusetts
People from Waltham, Massachusetts
Boston College Eagles men's ice hockey players
NCAA men's ice hockey national champions
AHCA Division I men's ice hockey All-Americans